Jeanne-Hippolyte Devismes (January 4, 1770, Lyon — January 12, 1836, Caudebec-en-Caux) (née Jeanne-Hippolyte Moyroud) was a French composer. She studied the piano with Daniel Steibelt and married the director of the Académie Royale de Musique (the Paris Opéra), Anne-Pierre-Jacques Devismes du Valgay. Her only known works are a song, "La Dame Jacinthe", and an opera, Praxitėle, which was first staged at the Paris Opéra on 24 July 1800. The work was a success and ran for 16 performances. The score has not survived complete.

Sources
Jacqueline Letzer and Robert Adelson Women Writing Opera: Creativity and Controversy in the Age of the French Revolution (Columbia University Press) pp. 36–37

References

1765 births
1830s deaths
Year of death uncertain
French women classical composers
French Classical-period composers
19th-century women composers
18th-century women composers